"Jambi" is the platinum selling single from the Special Edition version of the album Stin Avli Tou Paradisou by Greek singer Despina Vandi. It was released in Greece by Heaven Music and in the US by Ultra Records.

Release history

Charts

See also
Despina Vandi
Despina Vandi discography

References

External links
Official website
The Fanclub

Despina Vandi songs
2005 singles
Music videos directed by Kostas Kapetanidis
Songs written by Phoebus (songwriter)
Number-one singles in Greece
2005 songs